Blind Faith was a British rock supergroup founded by Steve Winwood and Eric Clapton.

Blind Faith may also refer to:

Film and television
 Blind Faith (miniseries), a 1990 TV miniseries
 Blind Faith (1998 film), a film starring Courtney B. Vance and Charles S. Dutton

Literature
 Blind Faith (book), a 1989 true crime book by Joe McGinniss
 Blind Faith (novel), a 2007 novel by Ben Elton
 Blind Faith (comics), a superhero in Marvel Comics

Music 
 Blind Faith (Blind Faith album) (1969)
 "Blind Faith" (Chase & Status song) (2011)
 Blind Faith (Legend Seven album) (1993)
 Blind Faith (Walk on Fire album) (1989)
 "Blind Faith" (Warrant song) (1991)
 "Blind Faith", a 2002 song by Dream Theater from Six Degrees of Inner Turbulence
 "Blind Faith", a 1990 song by the Levellers from A Weapon Called the Word
 "Blind Faith", a c. 2018 song by Johnny Manuel, a member of Equinox
 "Blind Faith", a 1993 song by Poison from Native Tongue'
 "Blind Faith", a 2006 song by Quiet Riot from Rehab "Blind Faith", a 2018 song by Myles Kennedy from Year of the Tiger''

See also 
 Faith (disambiguation)